The Uplands district of Kearny, New Jersey is the residential area in  the northwestern portion of town, on a ridge between the Kearny Meadows and the Passaic River, along which runs Riverbank Park. Arlington is located within the Kearny Uplands.

See also
WR Draw
Kearny Riverbank Park

References

Kearny, New Jersey
Neighborhoods in Hudson County, New Jersey